The 1993 European Open-Lucerne was a women's tennis tournament played on outdoor clay courts at the Tennis Club Lido in Lucerne, Switzerland that was part of the Tier III category of the 1993 WTA Tour. It was the 17th edition of the tournament and was held from 17 May until 23 May 1993. Sixth-seeded Lindsay Davenport won the singles title and earned $27,000 first-prize money and 190 ranking points.

Finals

Singles

 Lindsay Davenport defeated  Nicole Provis 6–1, 4–6, 6–2
 It was Davenport's first singles title of her career.

Doubles

 Mary Joe Fernández /  Helena Suková defeated  Lindsay Davenport /  Marianne Werdel 6–2, 6–4

References

External links
 ITF tournament edition details
 Tournament draws

European Open
WTA Swiss Open
Sport in Lucerne
1993 in Swiss tennis
1993 in Swiss women's sport